Tamar is a village in Kenarporuzh Rural District of the Central District of Salmas County, West Azerbaijan province, Iran. At the 2006 National Census, its population was 1,064 in 243 households. The following census in 2011 counted 1,091 people in 321 households. The latest census in 2016 showed a population of 860 people in 245 households; it was the largest village in its rural district.

References 

Salmas County

Populated places in West Azerbaijan Province

Populated places in Salmas County